Graduate Together: America Honors the High School Class of 2020 is an American television special that was simulcasted on the major television networks and online on May 16, 2020. Created by the XQ Institute, the LeBron James Family Foundation, and the Entertainment Industry Foundation, the special was curated by basketball player LeBron James in collaboration with high school students and educators across the United States, including the American Federation of Teachers. The broadcast included a variety of commencement addresses, celebrity performances and inspirational vignettes aimed at high school students, whose graduation ceremonies and proms were cancelled due to the COVID-19 pandemic, due to it causing the closure of most schools worldwide.

Appearances

 LeBron James, host
 Zendaya, actress
 Kevin Hart, actor
 Yara Shahidi, actress
 Kane Brown & Maren Morris, singer
 Timothée Chalamet, actor
 Rodney Robinson, educator
 Megan Rapinoe, athlete
 Bad Bunny, singer
 Kumail Nanjiani, actor (via Animal Crossing)
 Olivia Wilde, actor
 Malala Yousafzai, activist
 Lena Waithe, screenwriter
 Julianne Moore, actress
 Shaquille O'Neal, athlete
 Chris Harrison, television personality
 Dave Matthews, musician
 Loren Gray, singer
 The Dolan Twins, internet personalities
 Lana Condor, actress
 Liza Koshy, actress
 Pharrell Williams, singer
 Barack Obama, 44th President of the United States

Students

Performances

Broadcast
The special was simulcasted on May 16, 2020, at 8pm EST on the major U.S. broadcast television networks ABC, CBS, Fox, and NBC, except PBS due to flex programming on member stations over most of their schedules and broadcast times for network shows may vary. It was also simulcasted on television networks California Music Channel and The CW, on Spanish-language network Univision, and on cable networks CNN, Fox Business, Fox News, Freeform, and MSNBC. It was also available for streaming in platforms such as ABC News Live, Associated Press, Bleacher Report, Complex Networks, Facebook, FoxNow, Hulu, Instagram, NBC News Now, NowThis News, PeopleTV, The Roku Channel, Roland Martin Unfiltered, Reuters, Sirius XM, Snapchat, TikTok, USO, The Washington Post, and YouTube.

Viewership

United States

 Broadcast network

 Cable network

Total Viewership = 14.674

References

External links

2020 concerts
2020 television specials
May 2020 events in the United States
Music television specials
Simulcasts
Television shows about the COVID-19 pandemic
COVID-19 pandemic benefit concerts
LeBron James
Cultural responses to the COVID-19 pandemic